San Juan Cathedral, dedicated to Saint John the Baptist, is a cathedral and parish of the Roman Catholic Church in San Juan, Argentina. It is the seat of the metropolitan bishop of the Roman Catholic Archdiocese of San Juan de Cuyo.

It is currently one of the most modern cathedrals in the country, consecrated on December 16, 1979. It was designed by architects Daniel Ramos Correas and Carlos Enrique Vallhonrat. The cathedral complex is located on the same footprint as the original cathedral building, built by the Society of Jesus in 1712 and used until damaged in the 1944 earthquake that struck San Juan Province.

See also
Catholic Church in Argentina

References

Roman Catholic cathedrals in Argentina
Buildings and structures in San Juan, Argentina
Roman Catholic churches completed in 1979
Religious organizations established in 1712
20th-century Roman Catholic church buildings in Argentina